Kelsey Creek may refer to:

Streams

 Kelsey Creek (Washington), a creek in Washington State, USA, that feeds Lake Washington
 Kelsey Creek (Lake County), a creek in Lake County, California, USA, that feeds Clear Lake
 Kelsey Creek (Black River tributary), a creek that flows into Black River (New York)

Settlements

 Kelsey Creek, Queensland, a settlement in Queensland, Australia
 Kelseyville, California, formerly called Kelsey Creek